Taspar Qaghan (Sogdian: t’asp’r γ’γ’n) or Tatpar Qaghan (Sogdian: t’tp’r x’γ’n, Rouran: Tadpar qaɣan; Old Turkic: 𐱃𐱃𐰯𐰺𐰴𐰍𐰣 Tatpar qaγan, 佗缽可汗/佗钵可汗, Pinyin: tuóbō kěhàn, Wade-Giles: t'o-po k'o-han) was the third son of Bumin Qaghan and Wei Changle (長樂公主), and the fourth khagan of the Turkic Khaganate (572–581).

Reign 
His reign saw further rise of Turkic power even to the point calling both Zhou and Qi emperors as his sons. He appointed his nephews Ashina Shetu as Erzhu khagan to east and Börü khagan to west as lesser khagans.

He switched his alliance from Zhou to Qi. Sent a horse as gift in 572 and granted defeated Qi prince Gao Shaoyi asylum. He transferred the former Northern Qi subjects, whether they fled to or were captured to Tujue, to be under Gao Shaoyi's command. However, he still maintained good relationship with Zhou, sending another horse as gift in 574.

Around the new year 578, Gao Baoning, sent a petition to Gao Shaoyi, requesting that he take imperial title. Gao Shaoyi therefore declared himself emperor, with military assistance from Tujue.

Taspar attacked Zhou repeatedly until spring 579, when he sought peace with Northern Zhou.  Emperor Xuan of Northern Zhou created the daughter of his uncle Yuwen Zhao (宇文招) the Princess Qianjin, offering to give her to Taspar in marriage if khagan would be willing to surrender Gao Shaoyi. Khagan refused.

In 580, after Emperor Xuan's death, Yang Jian, the regent for Emperor Xuan's son Emperor Jing of Northern Zhou, nevertheless sent Princess Qianjin to Tujue to marry Tuobo Khan.  After the marriage, Yang then sent the official Heruo Yi (賀若誼) to Tujue to bribe khagan to give up Gao Shaoyi.  Khagan agreed, and as a ruse, he invited Gao Shaoyi to a hunt, but instead had Heruo Yi capture Gao Shaoyi.  In fall 580, Gao Shaoyi was delivered to Northern Zhou's capital Chang'an, and he was exiled to modern Sichuan.

Taspar died in 581 from illness, leaving throne to his nephew Talopien.

Legacy 
Unlike his father and older brothers he embraced Chinese culture, especially Buddhism. He was converted to Buddhism by the Qi monk Huilin, for whom he built a pagoda. Taspar's death marked the beginning of a long decline and subjugation of the Göktürks to China. During his reign there was a veritable flood of Sogdian Manichean refugees from Persia and Buddhist Refugees from Qi and Zhou, both the result of pogroms. These Sogdians devised the Göktürk Runes to write the Turkic language, for translations of the sutras to Turkic, notably the Nirvana Sutra in 575.

Succession 

Taspar's death created a dynastic crisis in the khaganate. His Chinese wife Qianjin survived him, but Taspar bequeathed the throne of the Empire to Talopien, the son of his elder brother Muqan Qaghan. His bequest ran contrary to the traditional system of inheritance which demanded the throne to be passed to the son of the eldest brother, in this case Ishbara Qaghan. The council rejected the legality of Taspar's will stating his mother's non-Turkic origin. Thus appointed Amrak as the next khagan. Talopien's faction did not recognize Amrak. This crisis ultimately resulted in the civil war of 581-603, which greatly weakened the state.

Family 
He had at least two issues:

 Amrak Khagan
 Tughrul shad
 Qilibi Khagan

References

Göktürk khagans
6th-century monarchs in Asia
Converts to Buddhism
581 deaths
Ashina house of the Turkic Empire
6th-century Turkic people
Year of birth unknown
Turkic Buddhist monarchs